The Benton Unit is a prison located in Benton, Arkansas. It is managed by the Arkansas Department of Corrections. It was founded in 1974.

References

External links 
 Arkansas Department of Corrections

Prisons in Arkansas
Benton, Arkansas
Buildings and structures in Saline County, Arkansas